The List of Guggenheim Fellowships awarded in 2010: Guggenheim Fellowships have been awarded annually since 1925, by the John Simon Guggenheim Memorial Foundation, to those "who have demonstrated exceptional capacity for productive scholarship or exceptional creative ability in the arts."

Fellows

References

2010
2010 awards
Gugg